The Mixed 10 meter air rifle team event at the 2020 Summer Olympics took place on 27 July 2021 at the Asaka Shooting Range.

Schedule
All times are Japan Standard Time (UTC+9)

Results

Qualification Stage 1

Qualification Stage 2

Final

References

Shooting at the 2020 Summer Olympics
Mixed events at the 2020 Summer Olympics